Mandaithivu sea massacre was a civilian massacre of ethnic Tamils by members of the Sri Lankan Navy off the coast of Mandaitivu island of the Jaffna peninsula. 33 civilians, all of them fishermen mostly from Gurunagar, who had been fishing at sea were attacked, tortured and murdered by Sri Lankan Navy personnel.

Massacre
Mandaitivu is an islet situated off the Jaffna peninsula and is connected to the city of Jaffna by means of a causeway. 

On 10 June 1986, Sri Lankan Navy personnel clad in black clothes approached a group of fishermen who were in the sea. The fishermen raised their hands to show they were civilians. The Navy however began to attack the fishermen and destroying their boats and nets. All of the fishermen were tortured and brutally murdered. The eyes of some fishermen were dug out. Stomachs of some fishermen were cut open. In all 32 fishermen from Gurunagar and one from Mandaitivu village were killed by the Navy.  The only fisherman Mr. Semon Mariyathas (41) who escaped death in the massacre is still alive. The fishermen who were massacred were aged between 13 and 62. According to the medical evidence led at the inquest, all the fishermen had died of multiple injuries to various parts of the anatomy due to machine gunfire.

Remembrance Day
10 June is observed as a remembrance day in the peninsula. A monument in remembrance of those dead was opened coinciding with the incident's 18th anniversary in 2004. A previous such memorial was destroyed by the Sri Lankan Army during a 'military operation' in 1996.

See also
 Kumudini boat massacre another massacre of Sri Lankan Tamils by the Sri Lankan Navy
 List of civilian massacres attributed to Sri Lankan government forces

References

Massacres in 1986
Massacres in Sri Lanka
Deaths by blade weapons
Maritime incidents in 1986
1986 in Sri Lanka
Sri Lanka Navy
Mass murder of Sri Lankan Tamils